The University at Buffalo School of Pharmacy and Pharmaceutical Sciences is located in Buffalo, NY. It is part of the SUNY system through the State University of New York at Buffalo.

In 2020, the school was ranked the #14 top pharmacy school in the nation by U.S. News & World Report.

History 
The University at Buffalo School of Pharmacy and Pharmaceutical Sciences Founded in 1886, it is the second-oldest component of the University at Buffalo and is the only pharmacy school in the State University of New York (SUNY) system. The UB School of Pharmacy and Pharmaceutical Sciences is considered the birthplace of pharmacokinetics and pharmacodynamics.

Accreditation 
The UB School of Pharmacy and Pharmaceutical Sciences is accredited by the American Council of Pharmaceutical Education (ACPE).  The current accreditation period is through June 30, 2022.

Departments 
Pharmaceutical Sciences  
Pharmacy Practice

See also
List of pharmacy schools in the United States

References 

Pharmacy schools in New York (state)
Pharmacy and Pharmaceutical Sciences
Educational institutions established in 1886
1886 establishments in New York (state)